Shaftesbury Capital, formerly Capital & Counties Properties plc, (Capco) is a United Kingdom-based property investment and development company focused on sites in the West End of London. It is listed on the London and Johannesburg stock exchanges and is a constituent of the FTSE 250 Index.

History
In May 2010, Capital & Counties Properties was demerged from Liberty International (now renamed Intu Properties). The company once had an interest in Great Capital Partnership (a 50-50 joint venture with Great Portland Estates which invested in commercial property in the Regent Street and Piccadilly areas), but that entity sold its remaining asset in June 2013. The company had a large interest in the Earl's Court area which then later sold its interest there (co-owned with Transport for London) to Delancey and a Dutch pension fund in November 2019. It acquired REIT status in December 2019.

In June 2020, Capital & Counties Properties agreed to purchase property tycoon Samuel Tak Lee’s stake in its rival Shaftesbury. The company acquired a 26.3% stake of Shaftesbury for a reported £436 million.

On 2 March 2023, the company announced the implementation of a proposed merger with Shaftesbury plc. The merger proposals saw Capital & Counties Properties changing its name to Shaftesbury Capital.

Operations
The company has a large portfolio focused on properties in Covent Garden. The market value of the company's property portfolio as of 31 December 2022 was £1.7 billion.

See also 

List of companies traded on the JSE
List of companies of South Africa
Economy of South Africa

References

External links

Real estate companies established in 2010
Property companies based in London
2010 in London
2010 establishments in England
Companies listed on the London Stock Exchange